Logan's War: Bound by Honor is a 1998 American made-for-television action film directed by Michael Preece. It was written by Walter Klenhard, based on a story he wrote with Chuck Norris and his brother Aaron. Chuck Norris also starred in the film, with Eddie Cibrian and Joe Spano.

Plot
In 1983, ten-year-old Logan Fallon witnesses the murders of his family (younger sister Jessica; their parents Nicholas and Terry) - along with five police officers - by Mafia thugs. Following said tragedy, Logan grows up on a New Mexico ranch owned by Jake Fallon (a former Green Beret and recipient of the Distinguished Service Cross) and Ben, the boy's paternal uncle and maternal grandfather, respectively.

Ultimately, Ben and Jake discover that Logan has been blessed with "proximity sense": the ability to perceive danger before it happens. Said gift previously saved Logan's life from the mobsters who slaughtered Jessica and their parents; sadly, his warnings were dismissed as youthful gibberish.

In 1991, Logan follows in Jake's footsteps by joining the Army and becoming a Green Beret. He learns martial arts and survival skills, becoming a tough and lethal fighting machine. Seven years later, he has achieved the rank of Staff Sergeant - and earned a Distinguished Service Cross of his own, by rescuing a downed U.S. Air Force Captain in Guatemala.

Logan returns to Jake's ranch, where they plan for Logan to leave the Army so he can avenge the murders of their loved ones. Logan is torn between obeying the laws of the land or living by his own rules. Traveling to Chicago, he visits his family's graves and discovers that Nick's best friend - now his executor - has invested wisely over the past 15 years, thus becoming very wealthy.

Using the name "Jimmy Testa", Logan infiltrates the underworld clan responsible for his family's death. Under the wing of Sal Mercado, Jimmy works his way up the Mafia ladder. Meanwhile, FBI Agent John Downing - who himself has been pursuing the Fallon killers for over a decade - reviews the old case files after Logan contacts him anonymously. Jimmy has been contracted to assassinate Joseph Landers, a local judge; acting on Logan's tip, Downing arranges for the judge's death to be faked. For carrying out said hit, Jimmy is slated to become a "made man". But at his ceremony, Logan reveals his true identity to all those gathered and proceeds to finish what the mob started 15 years ago, with an assist from his uncle Jake.

Cast

 Eddie Cibrian as Logan Fallon
 Chuck Norris as Jake Fallon
 Joe Spano as Special Agent John Downing
 Jeff Kober as Salvatore Mercado
 R.D. Call as Albert Talgorno
 Brendon Ryan Barrett as Logan Fallon (age 10)
 James Gammon as Ben
 Vinnie Curto as Johnny
 Devon Michael as Jesse Ridgeway
 Greg Kean as Hitman
 Matthew Tompkins as Nicholas Fallon
 Colette O'Connell as Terry Fallon
 Ariel Chipman as Jessica Fallon
 Rodger Boyce as Judge Joe Landers
 Oliver Tull as Officer Sam Brenbo

Release

Television  
The television film premiered on CBS on November 1, 1998, following a new episode of the Norris TV series Walker, Texas Ranger.

Reception

Critical response
The television-film was ranked third among the thirteen most viewed shows of that week.

Accolades
At the Lone Star Film & Television Award, director Michael Preece won Best TV Director.

Brendon Ryan Barrett was nominated for Best Performance in a TV Movie/Pilot/Mini-Series or Series - Leading Young Actor at the Young Artist Awards.

See also
 List of American films of 1998
 Chuck Norris filmography

References

External links
 

1998 television films
1998 films
1998 action films
American action television films
CBS network films
1990s English-language films